King's Cross is a ward of the London borough of Camden, in the United Kingdom. The ward has existed since the creation of the borough on 1 April 1965 and was first used in the 1964 elections. The population of the ward at the 2011 Census was 11,843. In 2018, the ward had an electorate of 7,274. The Boundary Commission projects the electorate to rise to 8,459 in 2025.

Councillors

1965–1978
King's Cross ward has existed since the creation of the London Borough of Camden on 1 April 1965. It was first used in the 1964 election to Camden London Borough Council.

1978–2002
There was a revision of ward boundaries in Camden in 1978.

2002–2022
There was a revision of ward boundaries in Camden in 2002. The ward covers parts of Bloomsbury and Kings Cross, which also crosses into St Pancras and Somers Town and the London Borough of Islington.  For elections to Parliament, King's Cross is part of Holborn and St Pancras.

Kings Cross lies in the south of the borough, and is one of three wards of Camden south of Euston Road (along with Bloomsbury and Holborn and Covent Garden).  It is separated from Bloomsbury by Upper Woburn Place, Tavistock Square, Tavistock Place, Hunter Street, and Grenville Street; from Holborn and Covent Garden by Guilford Street and Calthorpe Street; from the borough of Islington by Kings Cross Road and Pentonville Road; and from St Pancras and Somers Town by Euston Road.

Election results
Like all other wards of Camden, King's Cross is represented by three councillors on Camden Borough Council.  The last election was held on 22 May 2014, when all three councillors were elected.  They are all elected for the Labour Party.

From 2022
The ward will be redrawn for the 2022 election. Parts of the King's Cross ward will be transferred to the Bloomsbury ward, and parts of the St Pancras and Somers Town ward will be transferred to King's Cross.

References

Wards of the London Borough of Camden
1965 establishments in England